Window Media LLC was a gay press publishing holding company that acquired and operated gay and lesbian newspapers and magazines in the 2000s. In 2009 it ceased operations following bankruptcy.

Publications

Newspapers 
 South Florida Blade
 Southern Voice
 Washington Blade
 Houston Voice (first published as the Montrose Star)

Magazines 
 David Atlanta
 Eclipse
 411 Magazine
 Genre

Financial history
On November 16, 2009, all publications under the holding company were closed.

David Atlanta and Washington Blade have since returned under new ownership.

References

LGBT-related mass media in the United States
Newspaper companies of the United States
2009 disestablishments in the United States